"No Money Down" is a song written and recorded by Chuck Berry in December 1955. The recording session at Universal Recording Corporation was organized by Chess Records following the success of "Maybellene" and "Wee Wee Hours" singles the same year. "No Money Down" was first released as a single in January 1956, with "Down Bound Train" on the B-side, reaching number 8 in the Billboard R&B chart. The song was later included into Chuck Berry's 1957 album After School Session.

"No Money Down" features a repeating stop-time riff similar to the one that had previously appeared in Willie Dixon's "Hoochie Coochie Man", Bo Diddley's "I'm a Man" and Muddy Waters's "Mannish Boy". It tells a story, in great detail, of a man who enters a Cadillac showroom to trade in his Ford.

References

1955 songs
1955 singles
Chuck Berry songs
Chess Records singles
Songs written by Chuck Berry
Songs about cars